Pawel Wakarecy (born October 14, 1987 in Torun) is a Polish classical pianist. He is a winner of highest prizes at national and international piano competitions.

Wakarecy was one of ten finalists at the Warsaw XVI International Chopin Piano Competition of 452 entrants from 45 countries and received the Distinction Award with the prize of €4,000.

Biography 
Pawel Wakarecy was born on 14 October 1987 in Toruń in the center of Poland.

He was a student at the Academy of Music in Bydgoszcz, studying with pianist Katarzyna Popowa-Zydroń.

He is a winner of many piano competitions, including Szafarnia and Konin. He was a finalist of the Frederic Chopin Competition in Warsaw (2010).

References

External links 
http://www.culture.pl/baza-muzyka-pelna-tresc/-/eo_event_asset_publisher/eAN5/content/pawel-wakarecy
http://pl.chopin.nifc.pl/chopin/persons/detail/id/7378_Pawel_Wakarecy|agency=pl.chopin.nifc.pl

Polish composers
21st-century Polish pianists
1987 births
Living people